Thor Bishopric (born September 6, 1963) is a Canadian actor and writer. He is a prominent member of ACTRA.

Bishopric has performed roles in television and film, and provided his voice for animated and puppet productions and several films for The National Film Board of Canada.   He was also a writer on several shows and has worked as a voice director on several others.

Bishopric served as National President of ACTRA from 1999 to 2005.

Bishopric is the twin brother of the late actress and voice actress Kirsten Bishopric who was best known for voicing Zoycite, Emerald, Kaorinite, Telulu and Badiyanu in the original English adaptation of the Sailor Moon series.

Filmography

Live action
 Blackout
 Jacob Two-Two Meets the Hooded Fang
 Breaking All the Rules
 The Maharaja's Daughter
 Hallmark Hall of Fame
 April Morning
 The New Alfred Hitchcock Presents
 Looking for Miracles

Voice roles

 Saban's Adventures of Pinocchio
 Hans Christian Andersen's The Little Mermaid
 Heavy Metal
 C.L.Y.D.E.
 Young Robin Hood
 Wimzie's House
 For Better or For Worse
 Saban's Adventures of the Little Mermaid
 Animal Crackers
 Winx Club
 The Judy Show
 Anna Banana
 Kitty Cats
 Kid Kidettes
 Pig City
 Spirou
 Fred's Head
 Marsupilami
 Pet Pals
 My Life Me
 Tales from the Cryptkeeper
 How the Toys Saved Christmas
 Manon
 The Big Garage
 Woofy
 The Real Story of Itsy Bitsy Spider
 Flight Squad
 Sea Dogs
 A Bunch of Munsch
 The Country Mouse and the City Mouse Adventures
 Bob in a Bottle
 The Legend of White Fang
 The Little Flying Bears
 Ripley's Believe It or Not!
 A Miss Mallard Mystery
 Fennec
 Wunschpunsch
 Arthur
 Caillou
 Sagwa, the Chinese Siamese Cat
 The Secret World of Santa Claus
 The Adventures of Huckleberry Finn
 The Little Lulu Show
 The Bellflower Bunnies
 Papa Beaver's Storytime
 Sandokan
 Sharky and George
 Miss Pepperpot
 Calimero
 Cat Tales
 Patrol 03
 Journey to the West – Legends of the Monkey King.
 Lupo Alberto (season 2)
 2 Nuts and a Richard!
 Harvey Girls Forever!
 Ollie's Pack

Writer
 Kit and Kaboodle
 The Busy World of Richard Scarry
 The Little Lulu Show
 Young Robin Hood
 The Adventures of Paddington Bear
 Animal Crackers
 Caillou
 The Babaloos
 Back to Sherwood 
 The Country Mouse and the City Mouse Adventures

Voice director
 Charley and Mimmo
 The Big Garage
 Leon in Wintertime
 A Cargo in Africa
 Pipi, Pupu and Rosemary
 Pinocchio
 Wushu Warrior
 Nelly and Caesar
 Anna Banana

References

External links

1963 births
Living people
Canadian twins
Anglophone Quebec people
Canadian male voice actors
Canadian television writers
Canadian people of Icelandic descent
Male actors from Montreal
Canadian male television writers
Canadian voice directors
Writers from Montreal